This is a list of Harlequin Romance novels released in 1984.

Releases

References 

Lists of Harlequin Romance novels
1984 novels